Donald Cornelius Highsmith (born March 12, 1948) is a former professional American football running back in the National Football League. He played four seasons for the Green Bay Packers and the Oakland Raiders.

Highsmith went on to play for the Charlotte Hornets in the World Football League (WFL) and led the team in rushing. He was an all star. He went to Michigan State University on a Track and Field Scholarship although he was an outstanding running back for New Brunswick High School in his hometown of New Brunswick, New Jersey.

References

1948 births
Living people
American football running backs
New Brunswick High School alumni
Green Bay Packers players
Michigan State Spartans football players
New York Stars players
Oakland Raiders players
Sportspeople from New Brunswick, New Jersey
Players of American football from New Jersey